Ricardo Fernandes (born 12 November 1972 in Funchal) is a retired male badminton player from Portugal.

Career
Fernandes competed in badminton at the 1992 Summer Olympics in men's singles. He lost in the first round to Robert Liljequist, of Finland, 15-3, 15-11.
He also was the main inspiration for the naming of XquaX FC, a new football/futsal team created in Madeira Island in March, 2018.

References
European results
sports-reference.com
tournamentsoftware.com

Portuguese male badminton players
Badminton players at the 1992 Summer Olympics
Olympic badminton players of Portugal
Living people
1972 births
Sportspeople from Funchal